Lois Collier (born Madelyn Earle Jones; March 21, 1919 – October 27, 1999) was an American actress born in Salley, South Carolina. She was sometimes credited as Lois Collyer.

Early years
Collier's father was Ernest Jones, a pharmacist, of Salley, South Carolina. Chaperoned by her grandmother, she visited Hollywood when she was 15, later describing herself as "movie-struck" at the time. She attended Limestone College in Gaffney, South Carolina.

Film
Collier's acting career started at age 19 in 1938, when she had a small but credited role in A Desperate Adventure, starring Ramon Novarro and Marian Marsh. From 1940 through 1949, her career would be active and somewhat successful, with her playing mostly heroine roles in B-movies. Her best known film is probably A Night in Casablanca (1946) starring the Marx Brothers. During the 1940s, she often starred opposite western stars Bob Steele, Tom Tyler, and Dennis Moore. In 1950, she starred in the sci-fi serial The Flying Disc Man from Mars.

Collier was sometimes called the Fourth Mesquiteer because seven of Republic Pictures' The Three Mesquiteers movies featured her as the female lead.

Radio
Collier played Carol in the soap opera Dear John, which ran on CBS in the 1930s and 1940s. Beginning December 6, 1948, she was featured in You, a program on KMGM in Los Angeles, California.

Television
In 1949, Collier co-starred in City Desk, a drama about activity in the newsroom of a newspaper. From 1950 through 1957, she starred mostly on television series episodes. She played Mary, the hero's girlfriend and sidekick, in 58 episodes of the television series Boston Blackie, which ran from 1951 to 1954. She retired from acting after 1957.

Personal life
Collier was married to bank executive Robert A. Duncan. She was granted a divorce from him on September 3, 1943. On August 4, 1945, Collier married to Robert Jackson Oakley, an agent for actors. They divorced in 1956.

Death
 
Collier died of Alzheimer's disease on October 27, 1999, while living in a retired actors community in  Woodland Hills, Los Angeles, California. She was 80 years old.

Filmography

Film

Women Must Dress (1935) – Model
A Desperate Adventure, aka It Happened in Paris (UK) (1938) – Angela
Girls of the Road (1940) – Road Girl (uncredited)
Ice-Capades, aka Music in the Moonlight (US: reissue title) (1941) – Audition Girl (uncredited)
Outlaws of Cherokee Trail (1941) – Doris Sheldon
Sailors on Leave (1941) – Pretty Brunette (uncredited)
Gauchos of El Dorado (1941) – Ellen
West of Cimarron (1941) – Doris Conway
Mr. District Attorney in the Carter Case (1941) – Receptionist (uncredited)
Blondie Goes to College, aka The Boss Said 'No''' (UK) (1942) – Coed (uncredited)A Tragedy at Midnight (1942) – (uncredited)The Man Who Returned to Life (1942) – Mary Tuller (uncredited)Yokel Boy (1942), aka Hitting the Headlines (UK) – Stewardess (uncredited)Raiders of the Range (1942) – Jean TraversThe Affairs of Jimmy Valentine, aka Unforgotten Crime (US: TV title) (1942) – ReceptionistThe Courtship of Andy Hardy (1942) – Cynthia, Girl at the Dance (uncredited)Westward Ho (1942) – Anne HendersonThe Phantom Plainsmen (1942) – Judy BarrettMy Son, the Hero (1943) – Nancy CavanaughSanta Fe Scouts (1943) – Claire RobbinsGet Going (1943) – DorisYoung Ideas (1943) – Co-ed (uncredited)She's for Me (1943) – Eileen CraneLadies Courageous (1944) – JillWeird Woman (1944) – Margret MercerPrices Unlimited (1944, Short)Follow the Boys (1944) – Herself (uncredited)Cobra Woman (1944) – VeedaJungle Woman (1944) – Joan FletcherJungle Queen (1945, Serial) – Pamela CourtneyThe Naughty Nineties (1945) – Miss Caroline JacksonPenthouse Rhythm (1945) – Linda Reynolds, Junior's SecretaryThe Crimson Canary (1945) – Jean WalkerGirl on the Spot (1946) – Kathy LorenzA Night in Casablanca (1946) – AnnetteThe Cat Creeps (1946) – Gay ElliottWild Beauty (1946) – Linda GibsonSlave Girl (1947) – AletaArthur Takes Over (1948) – Margaret BixbyOut of the Storm (1948) – Ginny PowellMiss Mink of 1949 (1949) – Alice ForresterJoe Palooka in Humphrey Takes a Chance (1950) – Anne Howe PalookaFlying Disc Man from Mars (1950, Serial) – Helen HallRhythm Inn (1951) – Betty Parker

Television

 Dick Tracy – Fluff (4 episodes, 1950)
 Joe Palooka in Humphrey Takes a Chance (1950) – Anne Howe Palooka
 Rhythm Inn (1951) – Betty Parker
 The Unexpected – "Beyond Belief" (1952)
 Boston Blackie – Mary Wesley (58 episodes, 1951–1953)
 Letter to Loretta – "600 Seconds" (1955) (as Lois Collyer) Gloria Joy
 Cavalcade of America – "Sunrise on a Dirty Face" (1955) – Marion
 Damon Runyon Theater – "A Job for Macarone" (1955) – Mary Peering
 Cheyenne – "West of the River" (1956) – Ruth McKeever
 Screen Directors Playhouse – "The Sword of Villon" (1956) – Elaine
 It's a Great Life – "Operation for Earl" (1956) – Nurse
 Strange Stories (1 episode, 1956) – "Con Game" (1956)
 Broken Arrow (1 episode, 1957) – Johnny Flagstaff
 The George Burns and Gracie Allen Show
"Ronnie Gets an Agent" (1956) – Devlin's Secretary
"The Plumber's Union" (1957) – Julie Ames
 The Web (1 episode, 1957) – Easy Money (final appearance)
 Missile Monsters (1958) re-edited feature version of the 1950 serial Flying Disc Man from Mars

References

External links

 
 
 
 Lois Collier at b-westerns.com

1919 births
1999 deaths
American film actresses
American radio actresses
American television actresses
People from Aiken County, South Carolina
20th-century American actresses
Western (genre) film actresses
Limestone University alumni
Film serial actresses